Brian Rice may refer to:

 Brian Rice (footballer) (born 1963), Scottish football player and coach
 Brian Rice (artist) (born 1936), British abstract artist
 Brian W. Rice, American police officer